Vydmantai Wind Park is a wind park in Lithuania. The park was established in 2006 and originally was the largest wind farm in country. In 2011, the original owner Vėjų spektras sold the park to Russia-based energy company Inter RAO.

References

External links

 Official website

Wind farms in Lithuania
2006 establishments in Lithuania